Enayet Hossain Khan (1933–1979) was a Awami League politician and the former Member of Parliament of Bakerganj-16.

Career
Khan was elected to parliament from Bakerganj-16 as an Awami League candidate in 1973.

Personal life
Khan's daughter, Sheikh Anne Rahman, also became a member of parliament from Awami League at 11th Jatiya Sangsad.

References

Awami League politicians
1933 births
1979 deaths
1st Jatiya Sangsad members
Sheikh Mujibur Rahman family